The Latin American Table Tennis Championships is a table tennis tournament for Latin America. It was first held in 1978 in Mexico City. The second edition was held in 1980 in Rio de Janeiro. After these two editions the Latin American Championships were suspended till 1989. Between 1989 and 1992, the tournament was held every year. Between 1994 and 2000, the tournament was held every two years (in the even years). Since 2001 the tournament has been held annually. Since its first edition the tournament has included seven competitions; namely, men's single, double and team; women's single, double and team; and mixed doubles.

Results

See also
 Pan American Table Tennis Championships
 Table tennis
 Latin American Table Tennis Union
 Table tennis at the Pan American Games
 World Table Tennis Championships
 List of table tennis players

References
ITTF Statistics

Table tennis competitions
Table tennis in Latin America